A serotonin–norepinephrine releasing agent (SNRA) is a type of drug which induces the release of serotonin and norepinephrine (and epinephrine) in the body and/or brain.

Only a few SNRAs are known, examples of which include norfenfluramine and MBDB. Fenfluramine/phentermine (Fen-Phen), a combination formulation of fenfluramine, a serotonin releasing agent, and phentermine, a norepinephrine releasing agent, is a functional SNRA that was formerly used as an appetite suppressant for the treatment of obesity.

A closely related type of drug is a serotonin–norepinephrine reuptake inhibitor (SNRI).

See also
 Monoamine releasing agent
 Serotonin releasing agent
 Norepinephrine releasing agent
 Serotonin–dopamine releasing agent
 Serotonin–norepinephrine–dopamine releasing agent

References

Serotonin-norepinephrine releasing agents
TAAR1 agonists
VMAT inhibitors